The Intracorporate Conspiracy Doctrine is a common-law doctrine in American law that states that members of a corporation, such as employees, cannot be held to have conspired among themselves, because the corporation and its agents constitute a single actor for purposes of law. Therefore, it is reasoned that there is no plurality of actors needed to constitute a conspiracy. However, the doctrine is held not to apply in some areas of law. Furthermore, in some areas of law, is not uniformly applied the same way throughout the federal circuits.

References 

Common law rules